Bayezid II Mosque is a historical 15th century Mosque in Amasya, Turkey. The mosque was built in 1486 by order of the Ottoman sultan Bayezid II, it is the largest Külliye of the city.

Building
The Mosque has an inverse T plan of the Bursa type mosques, the prayer hall is covered by two domes. It has a portico covered by five domes and two minarets with one balcony.
The mosque is part of a larger complex (Külliye) which consists of a Madrasa (Islamic school), fountain, Imaret (public charity kitchen) and a library.

References

Amasya
Mosques completed in 1486
Mosque buildings with domes
1486 establishments in the Ottoman Empire
Mosques in Turkey